The Wampanoag are a Native American nation which currently consists of five tribes.

Wampanoag may also refer to:

 Wampanoag Country Club
 Wampanoag language
 Wampanoag Mills, a historic textile mill site
 Wampanoag Royal Cemetery, an historic colonial Native American cemetery in Middleboro, Massachusetts
 , a list of ships with the name